Datuk Chua Soon Bui (born 1 February 1955) was the Member of the Parliament of Malaysia for the Tawau constituency in Sabah from 2008 to 2013. She sat in Parliament as a member of the Sabah Progressive Party (SAPP), which commenced the 2008–13 Parliament in the Barisan Nasional coalition but joined the crossbenches in 2008. Recontesting her seat in the 2013 election, she finished in third place with 633 votes.

Election results

References 

Living people
1955 births
Members of the Dewan Rakyat
Women members of the Dewan Rakyat
Women in Sabah politics
Sabah Progressive Party politicians
Malaysian politicians of Chinese descent
People from Sabah
21st-century Malaysian women politicians
Malaysian people of Teochew descent